On the Air is the sixteenth studio album by American musician Billy Preston, released on February 18, 1984 by Megatone Records. This album marks the return of Preston to music.

Track listing
"And Dance [Extended]" (Billy Preston, Bruce Fisher) – 6:01
"Kick-It" (Preston, Ralph Benatar) – 5:47
"Come to Me Little Darlin'" (Benatar, Enzo Bilinelli, Preston, Galen Senogles) – 3:43
"Beatle Tribute" (Benatar, Preston, Senogles) – 3:21
"If You Let Me Love You" (Benatar, Bilinelli, Fisher, Preston, Senogles) – 4:23
"You Can't Hide from Love" (Preston, Fisher) – 3:35
"Oh Jamaica" (Benatar, Ken Lazarus, Preston, Senogles) – 3:49
"Here, There and Everywhere" (John Lennon, Paul McCartney) – 4:03
"And Dance" (Preston, Fisher) – 5:43

Personnel 
Billy Preston - keyboards, Hammond organ, organ, piano, arrangements, vocals
Ralph Benatar - acoustic guitar, flute, arranger, saxophone
Larry Lingle - lead guitar
James "Tip" Wirrick - scratching
Paulinho da Costa - percussion
Bobby Vega, Keni Burke - bass guitar
Jesse Kirkland - backing vocals
Joe Greene - backing vocals
Blinky - backing vocals
Merry Clayton - backing vocals

Production 

Produced by Billy Preston, Ralph Benatar and Galen Senogles
Arranged by Billy Preston and Ralph Benatar
Galen Senogles - Recording Engineer
Rob Klein - Assistant
Enzo Billinelli - Executive Producer
Tracks 1–4 Engineered and Mixed by Rob Klein and Ken Kessie
Tracks 5–8 Mixed by Galen Senogles, assisted by Rob Klein
Mastered by Jose Rodriguez
Garry Gay - photography

References

Billy Preston albums
1984 albums
Albums produced by Billy Preston